Saint Christopher Island or Île Saint-Christophe may refer to:

Saint Kitts, an island in the West Indies and part of the country of Saint Kitts and Nevis
St. Christopher Island, in Antarctica
Île Saint-Christophe, a small island in Trois-Rivières, Quebec, Canada